Tommy McHugh (1949 – 19 September 2012) was a British artist and poet. In his early life, McHugh was a builder and was also involved in youth crimes. When he was 51, he suffered a stroke on both sides of his brain that resulted in two burst blood vessels. He was sent into a coma for a week and acquired savant syndrome.

Injury 

McHugh attempted to evacuate his bowels quickly due to a knock on the toilet door. The sudden pressure led to an artery being severed on his frontal and temporal lobes, causing him to haemorrhage.

While relearning after his stroke, he began to write poetry to express everything he was experiencing. He also experienced an identity crisis which was most likely the motivation for his artistic outputs.

As an attempt to figure out the cause of his sudden personality change, McHugh wrote to and worked with two neuroscientists: Alice Flaherty from Harvard Medical School and Mark Lythgoe from University College London. A paper has been published about their discoveries.

Death 
McHugh died in 2012 from cancer.

Before his death, McHugh said that his strokes "have given [him] 11 years of a magnificent adventure that nobody could have expected."

References

External links 
 http://www.tommymchugh.co.uk

1949 births
2012 deaths
Deaths from cancer in England